Recea is a commune in the south of Argeș County, Muntenia, Romania, having a population of 3,272 (2002 census). It is composed of five villages: Deagu de Jos, Deagu de Sus, Goleasca, Orodel and Recea.

It lies in the Teleorman river valley and the main source of revenue is agriculture.

References

Communes in Argeș County
Localities in Muntenia